Harry McClure Johnson (May 13, 1886 – March 29, 1932) was a Chicago lawyer and member of the firm of Offend, Bulkley, Poole and Scott. He is the son of one of the oldest and most influential families of Illinois. He was the official journal chronicler in the 1st ever expedition to the top of Crown Mountain which brought about the genesis of British Columbia's provincial park system in July 1910.

Early life 
Harry McClure Johnson was born on May 13, 1886 in Peoria, Illinois. His father, Albert Tilford Johnson was the founder and president of the principal banking house of Peoria, Illinois. His mother Elizabeth Breading McIlvaine Johnson was a High School Teacher in Peoria.

He went to Peoria High School and graduated as the Salutatorian in the Class of 1903.
He then graduated in 1907 with the very highest honors from Princeton University in 1907 where he delivered the Latin salutary at the commencement on June 12. He studied law at Northwestern University Law School. There he received the degree of LLB (the Latin abbreviation of Legum Baccalaureus, also known as the Bachelor of Laws) in 1910. Harry McClure Johnson received Highest Honors for General Excellence as Academic senior honormen Bachelor of arts course in History, Politics and Economics from Princeton University. 

He moved for a short time to Chicago where he was associated with the law firm of Scott, Bancroft & Stevens from 1912 to 1915.

Military life 
Harry McClure Johnson participated in two military training camps for civilians in 1915 and 1916. However, due to a major surgical operation in 1917, he was unable to serve in the military until late 1918 when he was granted the position of first lieutenant. He served in the quartermaster general's office in Washington D.C. Following his departure from the army, Harry worked as an assistant counsel for the Emergency Fleet Corporation construction division in Philadelphia for over a year. Later, he practiced law on the Pacific Coast in British Columbia and California. Eventually, he established his headquarters in Chicago, where he has been practicing for more than a decade. He served in the United States Army in 1918. After the Armistice and during the years 1919 and 1920 he was engaged as counsel in the Legal Department of the United States Emergency Fleet Corporation in Philadelphia.

Life as a Lawyer 
On December 23 1910, Harry McClure Johnson from Peoria, Illinois was admitted to practice law after taking the Illinois bar examination. He made his home in Winnetka, Illinois which was in Cook County just 16 miles north of Chicago. Returning to practice in Chicago in 1921 he joined the predecessor of the firm of which he was a partner at the time of his death – Offield, Mehlhope, Scott & Poole.

Personal life
Harry McClure Johnson was married on June 30, 1923 in Ashokan, New York a camp in the Catskill Mountains not far from Woodstock, New York near the shores of the Ashokan Reservoir. His bride was Miss Helena Modjeska Chase of Omaha, Nebraska. Helena was living in New York and Omaha at the time and was active in recent years in north shore art circles. 

After they were married they moved to Winnetka, Illinois.

On May 15, 1925 Mr. and Mrs. Harry McClure Johnson of Evanston, Illinois announced the birth of their second child, a son and named him Harry McClure Johnson Jr.

On November 18, 1931 his 5th child was born and was named Priscilla McClure Johnson after his grandmother, the late Mrs. George H. McIlvaine of Peoria, Illinois (her maiden name was Priscilla Jane McClure).

Alpine Club of Canada 
Harry McClure Johnson was the nephew of the Hon. Price Ellison, mustached newspaper owner and minister of crown lands in Vernon, British Columbia, Canada.

Harry not only was a holiday visitor in Okanagan, British Columbia for a number of years but had lived for some time at the Price Ellison home.

As a life member of the Alpine Club of Canada he climbed Mount Robson, and Mount Assiniboine in the Canadian Rockies. In 1910 Harry McClure Johnson, as the expeditions's unofficial chronicler, and his cousin Myra King Ellison and her father Price Ellison (Chief Commissioner of Lands) and 20 others went on as expedition to Vancouver Island in Canada with a goal to find a potential for a park in the island centre. This group of explorers was the first to reach the peak of Crown Mountain in British Columbia. Mr. Harry McClure Johnson was to assist the minister of crown lands, Hon. Price Ellison, in the important work, while at the same time contributing to the college periodicals of Princeton during this exploration. He kept a journal of the whole trip. This journal of the Ellison expedition did not present a romantic view of the party's travels, as it described encounters with mosquitoes, sandflies, snakes, blowdowns, steep trails, and tree roots as well as spectacular scenery. And occasional journal entries suggest feelings of nationalism, ethnic elitism, and pride in conquering nature.

The team of explorers (including Harry McClure Johnson) left the town of Campbell River, British Columbia and travelled inland up the Campbell River to the Upper Campbell Lake. Later that party of nine scaled the Crown Mountain (Vancouver Island, British Columbia). Following the ascent, the party continued down Butte Lake in British Columbia, up to Price Creek and wound up at the Port Alberni.  The expedition trekked up the Campbell River, ascended Crown Mountain, explored the surrounding lakes, rivers and valleys, cross the divide, descended to the western sea and reported to the legislature that it was suitable for being the province's first park. This was a time when most of the province was uninhabited wilderness. This expedition led to the 1911 opening of the first park in British Columbia called Strathcona Provincial Park, named after Lord Strathcona, the railway tycoon who drove the last spike for the Canadian Pacific Railway at Craigellachie.

On 7 August 1912 he and his cousin climbed Mount Little which is on the border between Alberta and British Columbia. He took many photos of these mountains. 

After climbing Crown Mountain, Mr. Johnson has been working hard to encourage fancy American tourist groups, mountain climbers, and Canadian clubs to visit many of the big cities in the neighboring country. He has been doing this out of love and has been successful in making people want to see this amazing place for themselves. He has also been featured in important newspapers in the eastern and middle states, which has been very helpful. He had a very good singing tenor voice. He rode horses in Oklahoma Valley, Vernon, British Columbia, and on his Uncle Price Ellison's Ranch.

His Death 
He died at the age of 46 in Toronto, Ontario, Canada, where he was visiting his mother (Elizabeth "Gaga" Breading Mcilvaine Johnson), from a sudden attack of influenza which developed into pneumonia. He had been in poor health for two years. His widow, Mrs. Helena Chase Johnson and his five children survived. The five young children he had were Mansi (almost 8 years old.), McClure (almost 7 years old), Elizabeth (5 yrs. 3 mos.), Sarah Jane ( yrs.), and Priscilla (4 months old).  His wife Helena Modjeska Chase Johnson, (who was then only  years old), remained a widow for over 33 years (from 1932 till 1965). 

In his personal life Mr. Johnson's outstanding traits were his unyielding Integrity and his helpful and unfailing Loyalty to his friends.

Ancestry

References

Further reading

 Johnson, Harry McClure, "Journal of the BC Exploratory Survey Trip into the Buttle’s Lake
Region," 172pages, British Columbia Archives, MS-0249, vol. 1, fol. 35, Johnson,
3 August 1910.
 Johnson, Harry McClure, "Strathcona 1910 Discovery Expedition", 2012, Wild Isle Publications,  isbn=978-0-9680766-0-6, https://books.apple.com/us/book/strathcona-1910-discovery-expedition/id907592084

1886 births
1932 deaths
Lawyers from Chicago
Northwestern University Pritzker School of Law alumni
People from Peoria, Illinois
Princeton University alumni